An election was held on November 8, 2016 to elect 11 of the 21 members to Delaware's Senate. The election coincided with the elections for other offices, including the Presidency, U.S. House of Representatives, and State House. The primary election was held on September 13, 2016.

Delaware Republicans needed to have a net gain of 2 seats to flip the chamber from the Democrats, however, they gained only 1 seat (winning 10 seats compared to 11 seats for the Democrats).

Results Summary

Detailed results

District 1
Incumbent Democrat Harris McDowell III has represented the 1st district since 1977.

District 5
Incumbent Republican Catherine Cloutier has represented the 5th district since 2001.

District 7
Incumbent Democrat President pro tempore Patti Blevins has represented the 7th district since 1991. She lost re-election to Republican Anthony Delcollo.

District 8
Incumbent Democrat David Sokola has represented the 8th district since 1991.

District 9
Incumbent Democrat Karen Peterson has represented the 9th district since 2003. Peterson retired and fellow Democrat Jack Walsh won the open seat.

District 12
Incumbent Democrat Nicole Poore has represented the 12th district since 2013.

District 13
Incumbent Democrat Majority Leader David McBride has represented the 13th district since 1979.

District 14
Incumbent Democrat Bruce Ennis has represented the 14th district since 2007.

District 15
Incumbent Republican David Lawson has represented the 15th district since 2011.

District 19
Incumbent Republican Brian Pettyjohn has represented the 19th district since 2013.

District 20
Incumbent Republican Gerald Hocker has represented the 20th district since 2013.

References

Delaware Senate
Senate
2016